The 2015–16 Grand Prix of Figure Skating Final and ISU Junior Grand Prix Final took place from December 10 to 13, 2015 in Barcelona, Spain. Hosted by Barcelona for the second year in a row, the combined event was the culmination of two international series — the Grand Prix of Figure Skating and the Junior Grand Prix. Medals were awarded in the disciplines of men's singles, women's singles, pair skating, and ice dancing on the senior and junior levels. For the first time, medals were also awarded in synchronized skating.

Records

The following new ISU best scores were set during this competition:

Schedule
(Local time):

Thursday, December 10
 14:05 - Junior: Short dance
 15:20 - Junior: Ladies short
 16:25 - Junior: Pairs' short
 17:40 - Junior: Men's short
 Opening ceremony
 20:30 - Senior: Pairs' short
 21:55 - Senior: Men's short

Friday, December 11
 15:45 - Junior: Free dance
 17:05 - Junior: Men's free
 19:05 - Senior: Short dance
 20:20 - Senior: Pairs' free
 21:55 - Senior: Ladies short

Saturday, December 12
 13:30 - Junior: Ladies free
 14:45 - Junior: Pairs' free
 16:10 - Synchronized skating: free
 17:25 - Senior: Free dance
 19:45 - Senior: Ladies free
 21:00 - Senior: Men's free
 Awards ceremony

Sunday, December 13
 Gala exhibition

Qualifiers

Senior-level qualifiers
Due to the cancellation of the free skating/dance at the 2015 Trophée Éric Bompard, the International Skating Union announced an exception to the qualification criteria – Bompard competitors who finished seventh in the qualifying standings would be invited to compete in the Grand Prix Final.

Junior-level qualifiers

Synchronized skating
On 1 September 2015, the ISU announced that synchronized skating would make its debut at the Grand Prix Final. The top five countries would be allowed to send one team, with criteria used from placements at the 2015 World Synchronized Skating Championships. There would also be three substitutes. The following countries qualified:

 Canada
 Finland
 Russia
 Sweden
 United States
Substitutes:
 Germany
 Japan
 Italy

Medalists

Senior

Junior

Medals table

Overall

Senior

Junior

Senior-level results

Men
Yuzuru Hanyu set a new world record for the short program (110.95), for the free skating (219.48), and for the combined total (330.43).

Women

Pairs

Ice dancing

Synchronized skating

Junior-level results

Men

Women
Polina Tsurskaya set a new junior world record for the free skating (128.59 points) and for the combined total (195.28 points).

Pairs

Ice dancing

References

External links
 Official website
 2015–16 Grand Prix Final at the International Skating Union
 Entries: Junior Grand Prix Final, Grand Prix Final
 Starting orders and result details

Grand Prix of Figure Skating Final
Grand Prix of Figure Skating Final
Grand Prix of Figure Skating Final
ISU Junior Grand Prix
International figure skating competitions hosted by Spain
Grand Prix of Figure Skating Final
Grand Prix of Figure Skating Final
Grand Prix of Figure Skating Final